Air Marshal Sir Melvin Kenneth Drowley Porter,  (12 November 1912 – 28 March 2003) was a senior Royal Air Force officer who served as Air Officer Commanding-in-Chief Maintenance Command from 1966 until his retirement in 1970.

RAF career
Porter joined the Royal Air Force in 1928. He was appointed Chief Signals Officer at Headquarters RAF Balloon Command in 1939 and served in the Second World War as Chief Signals Officer at No. 11 Group, then No. 83 Group followed by Second Tactical Air Force just when air support was needed for the Normandy landings.

After the war he joined the Directing Staff at the RAF Staff College, Andover and then, from 1950, became Senior Technical Staff Officer at Headquarters No. 205 Group. He went on to be Officer Commanding at No. 2 Air Signallers School in 1952 and Officer Commanding at No. 1 Air Signallers School in 1953 before returning to the role of Chief Signals Officer at Headquarters Second Tactical Air Force in 1954. He became Chief Signals Officer at Headquarters Fighter Command in 1955, Commandant at No. 4 School of Technical Training in 1959 and Director General of Ground Training at the Ministry of Defence in 1961. His last appointments were as Director-General of Signals (Air) at the Ministry of Defence in 1963 and as Air Officer Commanding Maintenance Command in 1966 before retiring in 1970.

In retirement he became Director of Technical Education Projects at University College, Cardiff.

Family
In 1940 he married Elena Sinclair: they had two sons and one daughter.

References

|-

1912 births
2003 deaths
Commanders of the Order of the British Empire
Knights Commander of the Order of the Bath
Officers of the Legion of Merit
Royal Air Force air marshals
Royal Air Force personnel of World War II